

A

References

Lists of words